Joyce Maire Reynolds  (18 December 1918 – 11 September 2022) was a British classicist and academic, specialising in Roman historical epigraphy. She was an honorary fellow of Newnham College, Cambridge. She dedicated her life to the study and teaching of Classics and was first woman to be awarded the Kenyon medal by the British Academy. Among Reynolds' most significant publications were texts from the city of Aphrodisias, including letters between Aphrodisian and Roman authorities.

Early life and education 
Joyce Reynolds was born in Highams Park, Greater London, on 18 December 1918. Both her parents came from Walthamstow. Her father, William Howe Reynolds, was a civil servant and her mother, Nellie Farmer, a school teacher. Her mother taught her to read and write. Joyce was educated at Walthamstow County Girls' School, and then St Paul's Girls School, where she won a scholarship. Her parents were anti-war, and banned Joyce from reading what they considered to be pro-war writers such as Rudyard Kipling.  Joyce did not excel at nor enjoy 'games' (Physical Education) at school.

She studied Greats at Somerville College, Oxford, having been awarded an exhibition between 1937 and 1941. She graduated with a first-class degree in 1944. During the war, from 1941 to 1946, Joyce worked as a temporary civil servant, first as an Assistant Principal at the Board of Trade, later Principal.

Career 
From 1951 to 1979, Reynolds was Director of Studies in Classics at Newnham College, Cambridge, and from 1957 to 1983 she was lecturer in Classics at the University of Cambridge. From 1983 to 1984 she was a Reader in Roman Historical Epigraphy at the University of Cambridge and she remained an honorary fellow of Newnham College. In 1982 she was elected to the Fellowship of the British Academy.

Reynolds' students included Mary Beard, Pat Easterling, MM McCabe and Charlotte Roueché.

In her nineties, Reynolds continued to work, playing a prominent role in the online publication of Inscriptions of Aphrodisias (available online), Roman Tripolitania and Cyrenaica. Although Reynolds no longer taught, she did not fully retire, and continued to produce academic research. She died on 11 September 2022, aged 103.

Honours
Reynolds was one of six British women born in 1918 or before featured in The Century Girls, a book written by Tessa Dunlop to commemorate the 100th anniversary of women getting the vote in the United Kingdom, which occurred in 1918.

In 2004, Reynolds was awarded the Gold Medal of the Society of Antiquaries for distinguished services to archaeology.

In 2017, Reynolds was awarded the Kenyon Medal by the British Academy "in recognition of a lifetime's contribution to the research and study of Roman epigraphy". She was the first woman awarded this medal.

Reynolds received a Fellowship of Newnham College, Cambridge, in 1951. She was the oldest person to be awarded the honorary degree of Doctor of Letters (D.Litt.) from the University of Cambridge, on 20 June 2018. She was also an honorary Fellow of Somerville College. The Joyce Reynolds Award, a scholarship providing £10,000 towards the living costs of two Cambridge University classics undergraduates from under-represented backgrounds, was named after her. It was set up by Mary Beard, who was tutored by Reynolds.

Selected publications
 Inscriptions of Roman Tripolitania 2021 edition, by J. M. Reynolds, C. M. Roueché, Gabriel Bodard and Caroline Barron (2021), available here
 Inscriptions of Roman Cyrenaica, by J. M. Reynolds, C. M. Roueché, Gabriel Bodard (2020), available here
 Inscriptions of Roman Tripolitania, by J. M. Reynolds and J. B. Ward-Perkins, enhanced electronic reissue by Gabriel Bodard and Charlotte Roueché, with new translations by Joyce Reynolds and digital maps (2009). . Available here
 Joyce Reynolds, Charlotte Roueché, Gabriel Bodard, Inscriptions of Aphrodisias (2007), available here

References

External links
 Celebrating Joyce Reynolds—Conference
 The Classics Cabal at Apollo, "the international arts magazine"

1918 births
2022 deaths
British centenarians
British classical scholars
British women academics
Fellows of Newnham College, Cambridge
Women classical scholars
Alumni of Somerville College, Oxford
Fellows of Somerville College, Oxford
Fellows of the British Academy
Women centenarians
Presidents of The Roman Society
People from Highams Park
Fellows of the Society of Antiquaries of London